Greg Kent was a player in the American Football League and the National Football League for the Oakland Raiders and Detroit Lions in 1966 and 1968 as a tackle. He played at the collegiate level at the University of Utah and the University of Wisconsin–Madison.

Biography 

Kent was born Edward Greg Kent on July 18, 1943 in Elkhorn, Wisconsin. He attended Whitewater High School.

Kent lives in Alamo, California and is the co-owner of California Custom Carpets in Dublin, California.

See also 
 List of Detroit Lions players

References 

1943 births
American football defensive ends
American Football League players
Businesspeople from California
Detroit Lions players
Living people
Oakland Raiders players
People from Alamo, California
People from Whitewater, Wisconsin
Players of American football from Wisconsin
Utah Utes football players
Wisconsin Badgers football players
People from Elkhorn, Wisconsin